The A 0 is an A-Grade road in Sri Lanka. It connects Kollupitiya and Sri Jayawardanapura, the nation's capital.

The highway passes through Rajagiriya.

A00 highway